Reddaway may refer to:

Reddaway (trucking company), American subsidiary of YRC Worldwide
David Reddaway (born 1953), British former ambassador to Turkey
John Reddaway (1916–1990), British diplomat
Norman Reddaway (1918–1999), British civil servant and diplomat
William Fiddian Reddaway (1872–1949), English historian